Serve in Silence is the fourth full-length studio album by Filipino rock band Wolfgang. In contrast to their previous record, Wurm, half of the tracks on Serve in Silence are sung in Tagalog.

Track listing

Personnel
 Sebastian "Basti" Artadi (vocals)
 Manuel Legarda (guitar)
 Ramon "Mon" Legaspi (bass)
 Leslie "Wolf" Gemora (drums)

Additional musician:
 Boyet Aquino – drums (track 1,11,12)

Album credits
 Engineered by: Angee Rozul
 Mixed by: Angee Rozul & Wolfgang
 Mastered by: Angee Rozul
 Recorded and mixed at: Tracks Studios
 Some drum tracks are recorded at Midi Sound Studios
 Art direction & design by: Miguel Mari & Martin Mari
 Photo by: Cristina Castillo

Videos
 "Atomica"

Awards and nominations
Serve in Silence won the Album of the Year and Listeners' Choice Awards at the 1999 NU107 Rock Awards. The video for the track "Atomica" was nominated for Best Group Video at the 2000 MTV Philippine Video Music Awards.

References

External links
 Wolfgang discography (archived)

1999 albums
Wolfgang (band) albums
Rock albums by Filipino artists